Boris Stoev (11 December 1926 – 16 September 1998) was a Bulgarian cross-country skier who competed in the 1950s. He finished 42nd in the 18 km event at the 1952 Winter Olympics in Oslo.

References

External links
18 km Olympic cross country results: 1948-52
Boris Stoev's profile at Sports Reference.com

Bulgarian male cross-country skiers
Olympic cross-country skiers of Bulgaria
Cross-country skiers at the 1952 Winter Olympics
1926 births
1998 deaths